Luis Alfonso Ledesma Galán (born 23 January 1989), commonly known as Willy, is a Spanish professional footballer who plays for Córdoba CF as a striker.

Club career
Willy was born in Torremejía, Badajoz, Extremadura, and made his senior debut with CF Extremadura on 22 October 2006 at the age of just 17, starting in a 1–0 Segunda División B away win against CD Alcalá. In January 2008 he moved to Rayo Vallecano, initially returning to youth football.

After playing for Rayo's B-team Willy joined Real Betis, representing the latter's C and B-teams. On 5 August 2011, he signed for CF Villanovense in the third division, after impressing on a trial basis.

On 22 June 2013, Willy agreed to a contract with Arroyo CP, still in the third division. Roughly one year later he signed for Extremadura UD in Tercera División, scoring a career-best 29 goals during the 2015–16 campaign as his side achieved promotion to the third division.

Willy subsequently became team captain, and contributed with nine goals in 33 appearances (play-offs included) in 2017–18, as his side achieved a first-ever promotion to Segunda División. On 19 August 2018, aged 29, he made his professional debut by coming on as a second-half substitute for Samu Manchón in a 1–1 away draw against Real Oviedo.

Willy scored his first professional goal on 3 November 2018, netting his team's second in a 2–4 loss at Córdoba CF. On 21 January 2020, he cut ties with the Azulgranas, and signed a 18-month contract with Córdoba CF in the third division two days later.

References

External links

1989 births
Living people
People from Tierra de Barros
Sportspeople from the Province of Badajoz
Spanish footballers
Footballers from Extremadura
Association football forwards
Segunda División players
Primera Federación players
Segunda División B players
Segunda Federación players
Tercera División players
CF Extremadura footballers
Rayo Vallecano players
Betis Deportivo Balompié footballers
CF Villanovense players
Extremadura UD footballers
Córdoba CF players